Mohsen Tanabandeh (born April 15, 1975) is an Iranian actor, director and screenwriter. In 2022, he won the Orizzonti Award for Best Actor at the 79th Venice International Film Festival for acting in World War III (2022). He has received various accolades, including three Crystal Simorgh and four Hafez Awards.

Early life 
Tanabandeh has studied acting at University of Art and Architecture. He began theater acting in 1992 and appeared in his first cinematic movie in 2001.

Filmography

Film

Web

Television

Awards and nominations

References

External links 

1975 births
Iranian male film actors
Iranian male stage actors
Iranian male television actors
Living people
People from Tehran
Shahid Beheshti University alumni
Crystal Simorgh for Best Actor winners
Crystal Simorgh for Best Supporting Actor winners